Wu Chi-ming (born 24 February 1963) is a Taiwanese politician.

He attended De Lin Institute of Technology.

Wu was first elected to the Taipei County Council in 2006. The county was upgraded to the special municipality New Taipei in 2010, and the council was renamed. Wu retained his seat in that year's local elections, and was reelected to the New Taipei City Council in 2014.

2016 legislative election
He resigned his council seat in 2016, when he was elected to the Legislative Yuan.

References

1963 births
Living people
New Taipei Members of the Legislative Yuan
Members of the 9th Legislative Yuan
Democratic Progressive Party Members of the Legislative Yuan
Politicians of the Republic of China on Taiwan from Yunlin County
Members of the 10th Legislative Yuan
New Taipei City Councilors